Nové Vilémovice (in German Neu-Wilmsdorf) is a small village located in the Rychlebské Hory (Reichensteiner Gebirge in German) in the north-western part of Moravia in the Czech Republic, a territory historically known as Sudetenland. In the past, the village also administered two nearby settlements Hraničky and Červený Důl and today is a part of the village Uhelná.

Establishment

The village lies about 10 km south-west from the town Javorník (Jauernig in German) and was founded in the 13th century along a small mountain stream in the heart of Rychlebské Hory. Together with another local village Travná (Krautenwalde in German ), Nové Vilémovice belong among the oldest settlements in the region. Initially, it was owned by the members of the Haugwitz family, but in the 15th century was sold to the Principality of Neisse Grottkau, which was under the rule of the prince-bishops of Breslau. During this period most people moved out of Nové Vilémovice and by 1460 the village was empty. In 1580, under bishop Martin von Gerstmann of Breslau the settlement was again repopulated, but the number of citizens never reached its former size. By 1767 a small chapel was built in the village, this was in 1832 elevated to a rectory, and in 1768 also a school house. Majority of the 800 or so citizens worked in agriculture related fields, manufacturing and as forest workers.

Recent history

As most towns and villages in the region, Nové Vilémovice was a purely German settlement. Consequently, after 1945, under the Beneš decrees, all its citizens were forced to leave Czechoslovakia. By 1947 the village was nearly empty and was never properly resettled under the repopulation programs of the Czechoslovakian government. The village suffered from neglect and the condition of the standing structures deteriorated. In 1976 the local church burned down and was torn down in the early 1980s. Today, only few houses in Nové Vilémovice still stand and serve mainly as weekend holiday homes.

References

External links
 Web-page about the Rychlebské Hory and Jeseníky area
 Web-page about the Rychlebské Hory region
 Web-page about no longer existing and disappearing settlements in Sudetenland

Villages in Jeseník District